Wrightstown is a village in Brown and Outagamie counties in the U.S. state of Wisconsin. The population was 2,827 at the 2010 census. Of this, 2,676 were in Brown County, and 151 were in Outagamie County. The village is surrounded mostly by the westernmost part of the Town of Wrightstown in Brown County. On February 28, 2002, the village annexed a portion of land within the adjacent Town of Kaukauna in Outagamie County.

Wrightstown is part of the Green Bay Metropolitan Statistical Area.

History
The original establishment was called Bridgeport by its founder.  Mr. Wright acquired much of the property in this settlement following his arrival in 1833.
A post office called Wrightstown has been in operation since 1852. The village was named for Joel Wright, the owner of the original town site.

Geography
Wrightstown is located at  (44.326, -88.164).

The Fox River runs through the middle of the village.

Climate

Demographics

2010 census
As of the census of 2010, there were 2,827 people, 1,027 households, and 776 families living in the village. The racial makeup of the village was 94.8% White, 0.8% African American, 0.8% Native American, 0.8% Asian, 1.7% from other races, and 1.0% from two or more races. Hispanic or Latino of any race were 4.4% of the population.

There were 1,027 households, of which 43.9% had children under the age of 18 living with them, 63.4% were married couples living together, 7.7% had a female householder with no husband present, 4.5% had a male householder with no wife present, and 24.4% were non-families. 19.4% of all households were made up of individuals, and 6.8% had someone living alone who was 65 years of age or older. The average household size was 2.75 and the average family size was 3.17.

The median age in the village was 33 years. 31.6% of residents were under the age of 18; 6% were between the ages of 18 and 24; 32.5% were from 25 to 44; 21.9% were from 45 to 64; and 8.1% were 65 years of age or older. The gender makeup of the village was 51.4% male and 48.6% female.

2000 census
As of the census of 2000, there were 1,934 people, 701 households, and 525 families living in the village. The population density was 782.3 people per square mile (302.3/km2). There were 729 housing units at an average density of 294.9 per square mile (114.0/km2). The racial makeup of the village was 97.10% White, 0.26% Black or African American, 0.36% Native American, 0.93% Asian, 0.57% from other races, and 0.78% from two or more races. 1.76% of the population were Hispanic or Latino of any race.

There were 701 households, out of which 41.7% had children under the age of 18 living with them, 62.2% were married couples living together, 9.3% had a female householder with no husband present, and 25.0% were non-families. 20.3% of all households were made up of individuals, and 7.3% had someone living alone who was 65 years of age or older. The average household size was 2.76 and the average family size was 3.21.

In the village, the population was spread out, with 31.5% under the age of 18, 7.6% from 18 to 24, 36.1% from 25 to 44, 17.7% from 45 to 64, and 7.0% who were 65 years of age or older. The median age was 31 years. For every 100 females, there were 104.0 males. For every 100 females age 18 and over, there were 104.0 males.

The median income for a household in the village was $52,885, and the median income for a family was $57,788. Males had a median income of $39,632 versus $26,705 for females. The per capita income for the village was $20,767. About 3.5% of families and 5.4% of the population were below the poverty line, including 7.9% of those under age 18 and 9.7% of those age 65 or over.

Religion
St. John Lutheran Church, a member of the Wisconsin Evangelical Lutheran Synod (WELS), is one of the churches in Wrightstown. Built in 1911, it was designed by architect Wallace W. De Long.

Images

References

External links

 Village of Wrightstown, Wisconsin

Villages in Wisconsin
Villages in Brown County, Wisconsin
Villages in Outagamie County, Wisconsin
Green Bay metropolitan area